Pish Mant-e Owl (also Romanized as Pīsh Mant-e Owl; also known as Pish Mant-e Kahur) is a village in Jahliyan Rural District, in the Central District of Konarak County, Sistan and Baluchestan Province, Iran. At the 2006 census, its population was 181, in 45 families.

References 

Populated places in Konarak County